is a Japanese gravure idol and actress who is known for portraying Sena Hayami in Mashin Sentai Kiramager. She is represented by A-Plus.

Biography
Yume Shinjo was born in Gunma Prefecture.

In 2018, she made her debut as a model signed by A-PLUS agency.

In 2020, she was cast in Mashin Sentai Kiramager as Sena Hayami/Kirama Green.

Filmography

TV dramas

Films

References

External links
 Official agency profile
 
 

1998 births
Living people
21st-century Japanese actresses
Japanese gravure idols
People from Gunma Prefecture